The Brazil women's youth national handball team is the national under-17 handball team of Brazil. Controlled by the Brazilian Handball Confederation that is an affiliate of the International Handball Federation IHF and also a part of the South and Central America Handball Confederation SCAHC. The team represents the country in international matches.

History

Statistics

Youth Olympic Games 

 Champions   Runners up   Third place   Fourth place

IHF World Championship 

 Champions   Runners up   Third place   Fourth place

Squad
Last world championship.
 3 FAURE Rafaela
 7 SANTOS Andrezza
 8 OLIVEIRA Mariah
 9 MENDES Gabriella
 11 CORREIA Bruna
 12 SOUZA Geandra
 13 ALBUQUERQUE Iasmim
 14 LEMOS Mariana
 15 CURI Glovanna
 18 NOGUEIRA Gilvana
 19 BAPTISTA Bruna
 24 SANTOS Maria Eduarda
 41 P.SANTOS Giulia
 50 SILVA Wendy
 87 ARRUDA Renata
 88 FELIX Jamily

Notable players

References

External links 
 Official Website 

Handball in Brazil
Women's handball in Brazil
Women's national youth handball teams
Handball